Michael Torres Cuevas (born 24 November 1994) is a Spanish-Dominican professional basketball player for Coosur Real Betis of the Spanish Liga ACB.

Club career
As a Late bloomer, Mike Torres worked his way up all the way from the Spanish fourth division (Liga EBA) to the internationally highly recognized Liga ACB within only a few years.  

Mike Torres started out his club career with CB Castelldefels in the 2014–15 Liga EBA season. For the next season, he joined the competitor CB Villarrobledo.

In 2016, he joined Albacete Basket, which just got promoted to the LEB Plata.

In 2019, he made his debut in the silver category of Spanish basketball. With CB Ciudad de Valladolid, during the 2019–20 LEB Oro season, Mike Torres averaged 19 minutes in which he recorded 9 points and 2.7 assists per game.

Torres later signed with Coosur Real Betis of the Liga ACB for three seasons.

On July 30, 2021, he was loaned to Indios de San Francisco of the Dominican Republic League.

On September 10, 2021, he has signed with Belfius Mons-Hainaut of the Belgian Pro Basketball League.

On November 1, 2021, Torres signed with Capitanes for the team's first G League season.

On January 12, 2022, Torres returned to Coosur Real Betis.

National team
Torres has been a member of the Dominican Republic men's national basketball team.

References

External links
FIBA profile
Profile at Eurobasket.com
Profile at RealGM

1994 births
Living people
Capitanes de Ciudad de México players
Dominican Republic men's basketball players
Dominican Republic people of Spanish descent
Point guards
Real Betis Baloncesto players